Poedua (circa 1758 – ?) was a princess, daughter of Orea (Orio), King of Ulietea (Raiatea). She was taken hostage together with her father, brother, and husband during  the third voyage of James Cook in exchange for two sailors that had deserted onto the island. The hostages were enticed on board  and imprisoned until Orea secured the return of the deserters.

For many contemporaries John Weber's portrait of Poedua epitomized the sensual image of the South Sea maiden.

Notes

French Polynesian royalty
People from Raiatea
Princesses
1750s births
Year of death unknown